Joseph Anthony Rogalski (July 15, 1912 – November 20, 1951), was a Major League Baseball pitcher who played in  with the Detroit Tigers. He batted and threw right-handed. He was born in and died in Ashland, Wisconsin.

References

External links

 

1912 births
1951 deaths
Major League Baseball pitchers
Baseball players from Wisconsin
Detroit Tigers players
People from Ashland, Wisconsin